Mohamed Hichem Nekkache (born March 7, 1991) is an Algerian footballer who plays as a striker for CS Sfaxien.

Club career

Career statistics

Club

Honours

Club

References

Living people
1991 births
Algerian footballers
Association football forwards
Paradou AC players
MC Oran players
MC Alger players
CR Belouizdad players
Algerian Ligue Professionnelle 1 players
People from Algiers
21st-century Algerian people